The variable colored vine snake (Ahaetulla anomala) is a species of snake in the family Colubridae.  It is the first reported sexually dichromatic snake from the Indian Subcontinent, and until 2017 was formerly regarded as a subspecies of the green vine snake, Ahaetulla nasuta.

Description 
This species is sexually dichromatic. Males are green and resemble the long-nosed whip snake (Ahaetulla nasuta), while females are brown in color and physically resemble the brown-speckled whipsnake (Ahaetulla pulverulenta).

Distribution 

It is limited to India (Odisha, West Bengal, Jharkhand, Bihar) and Bangladesh.

Characteristics 
Ahaetulla anomala shows color polymorphism and has a gradient of green and brown colour. Sexual dichromatism is rare among snakes and is mostly only documented in some groups such as vipers (Bothrops), Comoran snakes (Lycodryas), and Malagasy leaf-nosed snakes (Langaha madagascariensis).

History 

This snake was first described by Thomas Nelson Annandale (the first director of the Zoological Survey of India) in 1906.

For more than 100 years, its sexually dimorphic color scheme led to confusion of the females with the brown-speckled whipsnake and the males with the long-nosed whip snake. To resolve this confusion a team of biologists conducted molecular and morphological study of this snake, ultimately finding it to be a distinct species from both the long-nosed and brown-speckled whipsnakes.

A 2020 study found A. anomala to be possibly conspecific with A. oxyrhyncha.

References 

Reptiles described in 1906
Ahaetulla
Snakes of Asia